Yuttapong Srilakorn (born July 12, 1985), is a Thai professional footballer who plays as a defender for Thai League 3 club Songkhla.

Honours

Club
Saraburi
 Regional League Central-East Division: 2010
Nongbua Pitchaya
 Thai League 2: 2020-21

References

External links

1985 births
Living people
Yuttapong Srilakorn
Yuttapong Srilakorn
Association football defenders
Yuttapong Srilakorn
Yuttapong Srilakorn
Yuttapong Srilakorn
Yuttapong Srilakorn
Yuttapong Srilakorn
Yuttapong Srilakorn